Fettes College is a co-educational private boarding and day school in Edinburgh, Scotland, with over two-thirds of its pupils in residence on campus. The school was originally a boarding school for boys only and became co-ed in 1983. In 1978 the College had a nine-hole golf course, an ice-skating rink used in winter for ice hockey and in summer as an outdoor swimming pool, a cross-country running track and a rifle shooting range within the forested 300-acre grounds. Fettes is sometimes referred to as a public school, although that term was traditionally used in Scotland for state schools. The school was founded with a bequest of Sir William Fettes in 1870 and started admitting girls in 1970. It follows the English rather than the Scottish education system and has nine houses. The main building, called the Bryce Building, was designed by David Bryce.

History

To perpetuate the memory of his only son William, who had predeceased him in 1815, Sir William Fettes (1750–1836), a former Lord Provost of Edinburgh and a wealthy city merchant, bequeathed the then very large sum of £166,000 to be set aside for the education of poor children and orphans.

After his death the bequest was invested, and the accumulated sum was then used to acquire the 350 acres of land, to build the main building and to found the school in 1870. Fettes College opened with 53 pupils (40 were Foundation Scholars with 11 others boarding and two day pupils). Following serious fires, the swimming baths were rebuilt in 1890 and the chemistry laboratory was rebuilt in 1897. The cricket pavilion was completed in 1906.

In summer 1914 the school's summer camp at Barry had to be abandoned when both the commanding officer and the adjutant were called up for service in the First World War. Of the 2,000 former pupils who had by then been educated at the school, 1,094 served in the armed forces, and 246 died during their war service. In 1921 a war memorial designed by Birnie Rhind, bearing the inscription "carry on", was unveiled by Major-General Sir William Macpherson in the school grounds. A central heating system was first introduced in the main building in 1920, and electric light was first introduced in the school in 1924.

In October 1939, early in the Second World War, the school had its first experience of hostilities when a German Junkers Ju 88 flew low over the school playing fields en route to bomb Rosyth Dockyard. Kimmerghame House was requisitioned for use as a section of the mine research unit HMS Vernon. A total of 118 former boys died in the Second World War. In the mid-1940s Sean Connery, a milkman with the St. Cuthbert's Co-operative Society, delivered milk to the school in the mornings.

The school chapel was enlarged by adding a chancel and a gallery in 1948. A new school running track was opened in 1954 giving a boost to athletics at the school and Queen Elizabeth II and the Duke of Edinburgh visited the school in 1955.

In the early 1960s the school was required to sell 18 acres of land to allow Telford College to be built and to sell 14 acres for a new headquarters for Lothian and Borders Police. Following a public inquiry in 1965 the school was also forced to sell 15 acres of land to allow Broughton High School to be re-built. A new dining hall was opened in 1966 and a new school library was opened in 1970. The Queen Mother also opened a new science school in 1970.

An all-boys school until 1970, when female pupils were first admitted for the final year, Fettes became fully co-educational in 1983. In 1988 the school sold 13 acres of land to McCarthy & Stone for residential use for £3million: the proceeds were used by the school to finance the refurbishment of the boys' houses.

In the late 1990s the school performed particularly well academically: in 1998 Fettes was placed fourth in the Daily Telegraph league table of schools. In 1999 Fettes was placed fifth in the Sunday Times list of top mixed independent schools in the UK and in 2001 Fettes was declared "Scottish School of the year" by the Sunday Times.

In March 2009 Fettes won the Scottish Schools U18 Rugby Cup, at Murrayfield Stadium, for the first time and in April 2009 Her Majesty's Inspectorate of Education (HMIE) published a report on Fettes that evaluated the school as "excellent" in four out of five Quality Indicators and "very good" in the other.

It is said that Fettes "used to have a hearty, rugger-bugger, Caledonian image". Some journalists have described Fettes as "the Eton of the North". Former headmaster Michael Spens jokingly countered on a BBC documentary that "Eton College was the Fettes of the South!"

In 2020 and 2021 six men accused a man who had taught at Fettes and Edinburgh Academy of physical and sexual abuse at the schools when they were pupils in the 1970s. The Scottish Crown Prosecution Service was initially reluctant to prosecute the alleged abuser because of difficulties in seeking his extradition from South Africa—he had moved there—and his advanced age, but South Africa approved the UK's extradition request, on six charges of lewd, indecent and libidinous practices and behaviour and one of indecent assault, in 2020. The lawyer representing Fettes made "a full and unreserved apology" to former pupils who had suffered abuse. The perpetrator admitted the abuse, and was fighting extradition from South Africa to Scotland in 2022. One former pupil was awarded £450,000 in damages in 2022 for abuse suffered at the School.

In 2022 a former pupil, who attended Fettes Junior School and Fettes College as a day student in the 1970s and 1980s, claimed he was abused while at the junior school, following a £400,000 settlement from the school's board of governors. Speaking to Scotland Tonight the man said he was beaten and sexually abused by a teacher. He claimed he was targeted when he was aged 12 because he was "more developed, and reached puberty before lots of the other boys". The matter was discussed in the BBC Radio 4 series In Dark Corners with Alex Renton, which spoke to dozens of former pupils who alleged they were abused by teachers at Fettes College and at Edinburgh Academy.

Curriculum
Fettes College follows the English rather than the Scottish education system. Pupils take GCSEs rather than Scottish Standard Grades and students now have the choice between A Levels and the new International Baccalaureate Diploma, but cannot take Scottish exams. Life at Fettes revolves around sports such as rugby, hockey, cricket, golf, tennis, rugby fives, rowing, basketball, rock climbing and squash in the afternoons and the various clubs and societies like shooting, fencing, CCF (Combined Cadet Force), debating society, drama, chess, music society, ceramics, crochet, running, badminton, robotics etc. in the evenings.

Fettes is an IB World School, one of only three schools in Scotland to have this status, the other two being George Watson's College (also in Edinburgh) and St Leonards School in St Andrews.

Boarding houses

There are currently nine houses: four for boys, four for girls and one for boys and girls. The houses are named after the estates of the first Trustees. The male houses are large period buildings which stretch from East Fettes Avenue to Crewe Road South along Carrington Road; two of the female houses are in the upper floors of the main College Building, the third is in a modern building in the eastern part of the grounds, and the new fourth girls' house is in the western part of the grounds and was finished in September 2012. The new house was built to reduce the pressure on the three girls' houses, which were accommodating more pupils than the four boys' houses. The Upper Sixth Boarding House, for both boys and girls in their last year at Fettes, opened in September 2007.

Boys

 Carrington (1872–present)
 Glencorse (1873–present)
 Kimmerghame (1920–present)
 Moredun (1870–present)

Girls
 Arniston (1982–present)
 College East (1984–present)
 College West (1984–present)
 Dalmeny (2012–present)

Boys and girls
 Craigleith (2007–present)

History
 Dalmeny was renamed Carrington in 1873.
 Inverleith was the previous name for the Preparatory School, now a separate entity.
 Dalmeny was the name of the day girls' boarding house on the ground floor of the west wing in the 1980s.
 Kimmerghame was the name of the junior boarding house between 1884 and 1895.
 Craigleith is a mixed Upper-Sixth Form boarding house established in 2007.

Architecture

The college's main building, by David Bryce (built 1863-69), blends the design of a Loire château with elements of the 19th-century Scottish Baronial. According to the school's website, the combination of styles and the site of the building led a modern architectural expert to praise it as "undeniably one of Scotland's greatest buildings".

The war memorial, a bronze figure of a fallen officer telling his men to "carry on" is by Birnie Rhind, 1919.

Coat of arms

The school crest is a bee because it appears at the top of Sir William's coat of arms and his seal (for letters, etc.) was also a bee. When the college's arms were granted, they were Sir William's with the colours reversed. Nowadays a more modern image is used but it is still the same coat of arms. The bee is the origin of the school's motto Industria. Its motif features prominently around the school. Beehives appear over the now-unused East and West doors of the College. A bee in stone watches over the front of Malcolm House (1880) and the Prep School. A large bee fronts Kimmerghame (1928) and there is an original lead bee in the porch of the Headmaster's Lodge.

Fettes tartan

A school tartan was designed in 1996 at the prompting of the Headmaster, Malcolm Thyne. It is a balance between the traditional kilt colours of green, blue and black and the Fettes colours of chocolate and magenta, with white stripes to add brightness. The Fettes tartan is worn as a kilt by boys and as a kilt skirt by girls who do not have a family tartan. The first showing of the kilt was on the hockey/lacrosse tour of Australia and Japan in 1998.

Fettes in fiction

Body Politic
In his first crime novel, Body Politic, published in 1997, featuring detective Quintilian Dalrymple and set in Edinburgh in 2020, Paul Johnston features Fettes College as a ruin, "blown to pieces in 2009" after it became a base for drug traders.

James Bond

While expanding on James Bond's back story, Ian Fleming wrote in You Only Live Twice that the agent had attended Fettes College, his father Andrew Bond's old school, after having been removed from Eton. An Andrew Bond is recorded to have been at Fettes as a boarder in Carrington House.

"Here the atmosphere was somewhat Calvinistic, and both academic and athletic standards were rigorous. Nevertheless, though inclined to be solitary by nature, he established some firm friendships among the traditionally famous athletic circles, at the school. By the time he left, at the early age of seventeen, he had twice fought for the school as a light-weight and had, in addition, founded the first serious judo class at a British public school." 
Fleming based his character on Sir Alexander Glen, an old boy of the school who was Winston Churchill's envoy to Belgrade during the Second World War.

While Fleming never claimed there was any source for the name of Bond other than James Bond, an American ornithologist, there was a real-life Commander James Bond RNVR who had attended Fettes. He was a frogman with the Special Boat Service, much as the fictional character Bond has a naval background. The school had his Who's Who entry copied and framed over the Second Master's office door in one of its main corridors. This has since been removed.

Several young James Bond stories refer to, or feature, Bond's schooling at Fettes. The cover of This Time We Are All In The Front Line depicts a young Bond and Housemates leaving Fettes in uniform to rescue survivors of Luftwaffe bombing of Leith Docks in the Second World War.

Captain Britain

Later to become Marvel Comics' Captain Britain, the British equivalent of Captain America, Brian Braddock was born to aristocratic parents in the town of Maldon, Essex.  After falling upon hard times, Brian's family had lost their place in society, leaving Brian a lonely yet gifted child who immerses himself in the study of Physics.
A prodigious talent, Brian is selected to attend Fettes College where he excels in his studies. Following the death of his parents (Sir James and Lady Elizabeth) in what seemed to be a laboratory accident, Brian accepts a fellowship at Darkmoor nuclear research centre. When the facility is attacked by the Reaver, Brian tries to find help by escaping on his motorcycle. Although he crashes his bike in a nearly fatal accident, Merlyn and his daughter the Omniversal Guardian Roma appear to the badly injured Brian. They give him the chance to be the superhero Captain Britain. He is offered a choice: the Amulet of Right or the Sword of Might. Considering himself to be no warrior and unsuited for the challenge, he rejects the Sword and chooses the Amulet. This choice transforms Brian Braddock into Captain Britain, the champion of the British Isles.

The Official Sloane Ranger Handbook: The First Guide to What Really Matters in Life 
This iconic 1982 guide to the British upper classes, aka "Sloane Rangers", described Fettes College as a "First XI" public school.

Heads of the college

There have only been 11 heads of the college since it was founded:
 1870 – 1889 Alexander Potts
 1890 – 1919 William Heard
 1919 – 1945 Alec Ashcroft
 1945 – 1958 Donald Crichton-Miller
 1958 – 1971 Ian McIntosh
 1971 – 1979 Anthony Chenevix-Trench
 1979 – 1988 Cameron Cochrane
 1988 – 1998 Malcolm Thyne
 1998 – 2017 Michael Spens
 2017 – 2019 Geoffrey Stanford
 2019 –      Helen Harrison

Other notable staff
 Eric Anderson, provost of Eton College
 Steve Bates, played for the England national rugby union team
 John Hay Beith, novelist, playwright and essayist
 Charlotte Cheverton, founder the Leith School of Art
 Henry Watson Fowler, lexicographer and commentator on the usage of the English language
 Thomas Fielden, Professor of Pianoforte at the Royal College of Music for over 30 years
 Robert Bowes Malcolm, staff physician
 Ian Robertson, retired BBC commentator and former Scottish Rugby Union international
 Morris Meredith Williams, designer of the frieze of the Scottish National War Memorial

Notable Old Fettesians 

Fettes College has produced many judges, lawyers, diplomats, military officers, politicians and persons from academia. In sport, its most notable alumni are on the rugby pitch. Four Old Fettesians have won the Victoria Cross and one the George Cross. Fettes also boasts a 2015 Nobel Prize winner in Angus Deaton.

See also
Fettesian-Lorettonian Club

References

Sources
Philp, Robert, A Keen Wind Blows, James & James, 1998

External links

 
 Profile on the ISC website

School buildings completed in 1870
Category A listed buildings in Edinburgh
Boarding schools in Edinburgh
Educational institutions established in 1870
1870 establishments in Scotland
Member schools of the Headmasters' and Headmistresses' Conference
Private schools in Edinburgh
Scottish baronial architecture
International Baccalaureate schools in Scotland
Clock towers in the United Kingdom